Robert Charles Beers (born May 20, 1967) is an American former professional ice hockey defenseman.  He currently serves as a radio commentator on Boston Bruins broadcasts on the 98.5 The Sports Hub Bruins radio network and is an occasional contributor to NESN Bruins and College Hockey broadcasts. Beers played Division 1 College Hockey at the University of Maine, in Orono, Maine. He is one of many former Black Bear players who went on to play in the NHL.

Career
As a youth, he played in the 1980 Quebec International Pee-Wee Hockey Tournament with the Buffalo Regals minor ice hockey team.

Beers was drafted in the 10th round, 210th overall, by the Boston Bruins in the 1985 NHL Entry Draft. He played hockey with the Buffalo Jr. Sabres, Northern Arizona University and the University of Maine before reaching the NHL level. His career was split between the NHL, AHL and IHL. Beers represented the United States in 1993, 1994 and 1997 at the World Championships. After retiring from the NHL, the Bruins organization brought him back to play on their minor league affiliate the Providence Bruins. He played mainly in home games through parts of the 1998–99 and 1999-2000 season, and was on the ice when Providence captured the 1999 Calder Cup.

Career statistics

Regular season and playoffs

Awards and honors

References

External links

1967 births
Living people
American men's ice hockey defensemen
Atlanta Knights players
Boston Bruins draft picks
Boston Bruins players
Boston Bruins announcers
Edmonton Oilers players
Ice hockey people from Buffalo, New York
Ice hockey people from Pittsburgh
Maine Black Bears men's ice hockey players
Maine Mariners players
National Hockey League broadcasters
New York Islanders players
Northern Arizona Lumberjacks men's ice hockey players
Providence Bruins players
Tampa Bay Lightning players
Utah Grizzlies (IHL) players
AHCA Division I men's ice hockey All-Americans